Kim Thorson (born March 2, 1932) is a lawyer and former political figure in Saskatchewan. He represented Souris-Estevan from 1956 to 1960 as a Co-operative Commonwealth Federation (CCF) member and from 1971 to 1975 as a New Democratic Party (NDP) member in the Legislative Assembly of Saskatchewan.

He was born in Macoun, Saskatchewan, the son of Miles Thorson (1900–1932) and Mary Ethel Sinclair (1911–2006).  Kim, along with his step-brother Barney Kuchinka, Jr.,(1931), his half brother, Darryl Kuchinka and half sister Ann Marie where raised at Macoun, Saskatchewan by Ethel and her second husband, Barney Kuchinka, Sr, (1904–1991)  Barney, Sr. and Ethel were married from 1933 until his death in 1991, Ethel died in 2006.

Mr. Thorson completed Grade 12 at Macoun, and continued his education at the University of Saskatchewan, where he received a BSc in Agriculture. In 1957, Thorson married Myrtle Lipsett (February 13, 1933 – December 16, 2020).

 Kim and Myrtle have three children, Eric Miles (January 15, 1959), Janet Lynn (May 23, 1960) and Vanessa Lee (December 11, 1966).  In 1960, Kim returned to the University of Saskatchewan, where he completed a Bachelor of Arts degree and a Bachelor of Law degree.  He became Queen's Council in 1972.
After completing his law degree, Kim returned to Estevan where he practiced law until returning to the Legislature in 1972.
After his defeat in 1975, Kim joined the Law Firm of Griffin and Bekke, later Griffin, Bekke and Thorson.
In 1991 Mr. Thorson left his practice in Regina to move to Weyburn, Sask., where he joined the Firm of Hardy and Thorson, later Thorson and Horner.  Mr. Thorson retired on Dec. 31, 2012. 
Thorson was defeated by Ian MacDougall when he ran for reelection in 1960. He returned to university to study law and then set up practice in Estevan. Thorson was elected again in a 1971 by-election held following the death of Russell Brown. He served in the provincial cabinet as Minister of Industry. He was defeated by Bob Larter when he ran for reelection in 1975 in the newly created riding of Estevan. Thorson later served as chairperson of the Weyburn and District Hospital Foundation.
Kim and Myrtle Thorson have eight grandchildren.  Viktor (1991), Arianna (1993), Thomas (1994), Anton (1994), Katie (1998), Loughran (1999), Lily (2003) and Sarah Butterfly (2010).

On December 16, 2020, Kim's wife Myrtle died, with her husband, and eldest son, Eric, at her side.

References 

Saskatchewan Co-operative Commonwealth Federation MLAs
20th-century Canadian politicians
Saskatchewan New Democratic Party MLAs
1932 births
Living people
Members of the Executive Council of Saskatchewan
Lawyers in Saskatchewan
Canadian King's Counsel
University of Saskatchewan College of Law alumni